Austroharpa pulligera is an extinct species of sea snail, a marine gastropod mollusk, in the family Harpidae.

References

pulligera
Gastropods described in 1889